Cool Water is the eleventh album by English progressive rock band Caravan, released in 1994. It is a compilation of old recordings, including their unreleased 2nd Arista album shelved in 1978.

Track listing 
All songs written by Pye Hastings

"Cool Water" – 4:07
"Just the Way You Are" – 3:43
"Tuesday Is Rock and Roll Nite" – 4:21
"The Crack of the Willow" – 5:35
"Ansaphone" – 4:59
"Cold Fright" – 5:21
"Side By Side" – 4:40
"You Won’t Get Me Up in One of Those" – 3:54
"To the Land of My Fathers" – 4:56
"Poor Molly" – 5:54
"Send Reinforcements" – 4:48

Personnel 
 Pye Hastings – acoustic guitar, guitars, arrangements, vocals
 Jimmy Hastings – saxophone (tracks 8 - 11)
 Jan Schelhaas – organ, piano, keyboards, Minimoog (tracks 1-7)
 Rod Edwards – keyboards (tracks 8-11)
 Richard Sinclair – bass guitar (tracks 1-7)
 John Gustafson – bass (tracks 8-11)
 Richard Coughlan – drums, percussion (tracks 1-7)
 Ian Mosley – drums (tracks 8-11)
 Recorded by John Burns and Maurice Haylett

producer   = Julian Gordon Hastings, son of Pye Hastings

Release information 
 1994:	CD Pony Canyon PCCY-00613
 1995:	CD Magnum America 7
 1998:	CD Castle 18
 2002:	CD Sanctuary 335
 2003:	CD Classic Rock Legends 1007

References

External links
 
 
 Caravan - Cool Water (1994) album review by Jason Anderson, credits & releases at AllMusic.com
 Caravan - Cool Water (1994) album releases & credits at Discogs.com
 Caravan - Cool Water (1994) album to be listened as stream at Play.Spotify.com

Caravan (band) albums
1994 albums